Events from the year 1632 in Spain

Incumbents
 Monarch – Philip IV

Events

Births

Deaths

 July 22 – Juan Niño de Tabora, Spanish general and governor of the Philippines (date of birth unknown)

References

 
1630s in Spain
Years of the 17th century in Spain